Río Indio is a corregimiento in Donoso District, Colón Province, Panama with a population of 1,044 as of 2010. Its population as of 1990 was 963; its population as of 2000 was 974.

References

Corregimientos of Colón Province